The 1962–63 Women's Handball European Champions Cup was the third edition of the premier international competition for European women's handball clubs, taking place from November 1962 to April 1963. Fourteen teams took part in the competition, with Denmark, East Germany, Hungary, Netherlands and Sweden making its first appearance, so a first round was introduced. 1962 champion and runner-up Czechoslovakia and Yugoslavia were granted byes for the quarter-finals. For the first time the final was carried out as a single match, taking place in Prague on April 14.

Trud Moscow, representing the Soviet Union as the first champion of the newly founded Soviet Championship, became the first of three Soviet teams to win the competition by beating Ruch Chorzów, defending champion Spartak Prague Sokolovo and finally Frederiksberg IF, which was the first team from Western Europe to reach the final.

First round

Quarter-finals

Semifinals

Final

References

Women's EHF Champions League
European Cup Women
European Cup Women
Eur
Eur